Mental health is an important aspect of overall well-being and it has been widely recognized that AI technologies can play a significant role in improving mental health care. AI in the mental health field is an emerging field that uses AI techniques such as machine learning, natural language processing, and other AI technologies to analyze large amounts of data to identify patterns, predict outcomes, and improve the delivery of mental health care.

Background 
Mental health conditions such as depression, anxiety, and post-traumatic stress disorder (PTSD) are major public health concerns, and they affect a large proportion of the population. Traditional methods of mental health care, such as psychotherapy and medication, have been shown to be effective, but they also have limitations. For example, access to mental health care can be limited in certain areas, and it can be difficult to accurately diagnose and treat mental health conditions. AI technologies have the potential to improve the diagnosis and treatment of mental health conditions by providing new insights and identifying patterns that may not be visible to human experts.

Methods 

 Natural Language Processing (NLP): NLP is being used to analyze large amounts of data from electronic health records (EHRs) and social media to identify patterns in mental health conditions and predict outcomes.
 Machine learning: Machine learning algorithms are being used to analyze data from EHRs, brain imaging, and genetic tests to identify biomarkers of mental health conditions and to predict which treatments will be most effective for specific individuals.
 Virtual reality and chatbots: These technologies are being used to deliver mental health interventions, such as cognitive behavioural therapy, in virtual environments. They also can provide mental health support to users through chatbots with natural language abilities.

Applications

Mental health diagnosis and assessment 
AI-based systems can analyze data from various sources, such as brain imaging and genetic tests, to identify biomarkers of mental health conditions and improve the accuracy of diagnosis. This can help to improve the early detection of mental health conditions and reduce the risk of misdiagnosis.

Personalized treatment 
AI-based systems can analyze data from electronic health records (EHRs), brain imaging, and genetic tests to identify the most effective treatment for specific individuals. This can help to improve the effectiveness of treatment by matching patients with the treatment that is most likely to be effective for them.

Virtual Therapies and chatbot support 
Virtual reality and chatbots are being used to deliver mental health interventions, such as cognitive behavioral therapy, in virtual environments. They also can provide mental health support to users through chatbots with natural language abilities. This can help to improve access to mental health care in areas where access is limited.

Mental Health Monitoring and Tracking 
AI-based systems can be used to monitor and track the mental health status of patients over time. This can help to detect changes in mental health status early and provide timely interventions.

Research and Development 
AI can be used in research and development to analyze big data and identify patterns that would be difficult for humans to see. This can help to identify new biomarkers for mental health conditions and develop new treatments.

Benefits 
AI in mental health offers several benefits, such as:

 Improving the accuracy of diagnosis: AI-based systems can analyze data from various sources, such as brain imaging and genetic tests, to identify biomarkers of mental health conditions and improve the accuracy of diagnosis.
 Personalized treatment: AI-based systems can analyze data from EHRs, brain imaging, and genetic tests to identify the most effective treatment for specific individuals.
 Improving access to mental health care: AI-based systems can be used to deliver mental health interventions, such as cognitive behavioral therapy, in virtual environments, which can improve access to mental health care in areas where access is limited.

Criticism 
AI in mental health is still an emerging field and there are still some concerns and criticisms about the use of AI in this area, such as:

 Lack of data: There is a lack of data available to train AI systems, which limits their ability to identify patterns in mental health conditions and predict outcomes.
 Bias: AI systems can be biased if the data used to train them is biased. This can lead to inaccurate predictions and unfair treatment of certain groups of people.
 Privacy: The use of AI in mental health raises concerns about privacy, as large amounts of personal data are collected and analyzed.

See also 

 Artificial intelligence
 Glossary of artificial intelligence
 Clinical decision support system
 Computer-aided diagnosis

References 

Mental health
Applications of artificial intelligence